James Francis Danby was an English landscape painter who excelled in depicting sunrise and sunset.

Biography
Danby was born at Bristol in 1816, the son of Francis Danby, A.R.A. 

His works appeared at the Royal Academy, and at the Society of British Artists, of which latter he was a member. Amongst his best works are:
 Loch Lomond.
 Dover, from the Canterbury Road. 1849.
 Dumbarton Rock. 1854.
 Morning on the Thames. 1860.
 Wreck on Exmouth Bar. 1861.
 Carrickfergus Castle. 1867.
 North Shields: Sunrise. 1869.

He died of apoplexy in London in 1875 and was buried on the eastern side of Highgate Cemetery. The inscription on the headstone above his plot (no.20952) has completely worn away.

References
 

1816 births
1875 deaths
Burials at Highgate Cemetery
English landscape painters
Artists from Bristol